Michael Burke (born 28 September 1985) is an Irish Gaelic footballer who plays for the Meath county team.
He has also represented the senior Meath county hurling team.

References

1985 births
Living people
Dual players
Gaelic football backs
Meath inter-county Gaelic footballers
Meath inter-county hurlers